Karl Fitzpatrick (born 13 September 1980) is a former Ireland international rugby league , and Chief executive officer of the Warrington Wolves in the Super League.

Playing career
Fitzpatrick was originally a scrum half before he switched to full back. He is a product of Wigan St Patricks. Fitzpatrick began his professional career at Widnes Vikings, followed by spells at Tonneins XIII (France) and Swinton Lions.

Fitzpatrick signed for Salford in 2003. In 2004, Fitzpatrick represented Ireland in the Rugby League European Cup, and also picked up the most improved player award at Salford.

He was named in the Ireland squad for the 2008 Rugby League World Cup.

References

External links
Profile at reds.originalreddevils.com
(archived by web.archive.org) Profile at rli.ie
Statistics at rugbyleagueproject.org

1980 births
Living people
English people of Irish descent
English rugby league players
Ireland national rugby league team players
Rugby league fullbacks
Rugby league players from Wigan
Salford Red Devils players
Swinton Lions players
Tonneins XIII players
Widnes Vikings players
Wigan St Patricks players